Randy Garber is a former U.S. soccer midfielder who played four seasons in the North American Soccer League and two seasons in the Major Indoor Soccer League.  He earned one cap with the U.S. national team and currently coaches youth soccer in Abington, Pennsylvania.

Player

High school and college
Garber attended Abington Senior High School, graduating in 1971.  He was inducted into the Abington Hall of Fame in 1998.  After graduating High School, he attended Mercer County Community College where he was an All-American both years.  He then attended Penn State University where he played on the men’s soccer team in 1973 and 1974.  He was recruited by coach Herb Schmidt to play soccer at PSU.  He was named a 1974 honorable mention (third team) All-American.

Professional
In 1975, Garber was selected in the second round of the North American Soccer League by the Tampa Bay Rowdies and later signed with them. During one of his games, he played head to head against Pelé and actually traded jerseys with him. He was traded in the middle of the 1976 season to the Los Angeles Aztecs.  At the end of the season, the Aztecs sold Garber’s contract to the Washington Diplomats.  During the 1978-1979 off season, the Dips played a series of exhibition indoor games in which Garber was the team’s second leading scorer.  The Dips released him in January 1979.  When released by the Dips, Garber joined the Cleveland Force of Major Indoor Soccer League (MISL).  Halfway through the season he injured his knee and was in rehab the rest of the season.  He was later traded to the Detroit Lightning.  The following season he played for the Philadelphia Fever, then retired.

National team
Garber earned his single cap with the U.S. national team in a 4-0 loss to Poland on June 24, 1975.  He came off for Tim Logush in the 40th minute.

Coach
Garber has coached extensively at the youth level, but he gained his start at his alma mater when he was an assistant to Penn State head coach Walter Bahr.  Since retiring from playing, he has spent most of his career coaching youth in Roslyn, Pennsylvania where he was the 1996 NSCAA youth soccer coach of the year. and the 1997 Eastern Pennsylvania Youth Soccer Association Coach of the Year.  He also coaches the Abington Senior High School boys soccer team, where he has been coaching for the past fifteen years.  Recently after this past fall 2007 soccer season he was awarded the High School Coach of the Year by the Southeast Pennsylvania Soccer Coaches Association. Also, in the 2007 season his team reached the state playoffs.

References

External links
 NASL/MISL stats

Living people
1952 births
American soccer coaches
American soccer players
Cleveland Force (original MISL) players
Detroit Lightning players
Los Angeles Aztecs players
Major Indoor Soccer League (1978–1992) players
North American Soccer League (1968–1984) indoor players
North American Soccer League (1968–1984) players
Penn State Nittany Lions men's soccer coaches
Penn State Nittany Lions men's soccer players
Philadelphia Fever (MISL) players
Soccer players from Pennsylvania
Tampa Bay Rowdies draft picks
Tampa Bay Rowdies (1975–1993) players
United States men's international soccer players
Washington Diplomats (NASL) players
Association football midfielders